Edelweiss Pirates is a 2004 German film directed by Niko von Glasow.

Synopsis
Based on actual events, the film is set in 1944. It is the story of a group of rebellious teenage German boys opposed to the war and Nazism. They become involved with an escaped convict who leads them into planning various acts of sabotage against the German war effort. This in turn brings them to the attention of the Gestapo.

Cast
 Ivan Stebunov as Karl Ripke
 Bela B. as Hans Steinbrück
 Jochen Nickel as Josef Hoegen
 Anna Thalbach as Cilly Serve
 Jan Decleir as Ferdinand Kütter
 Simon Taal as Peter Ripke
 Jean Jülich as old Karl Ripke

References

External links
 
 Trailer at YouTube
 

2004 films
2000s war films
German war films
2000s German-language films
Films set in 1944
Films about the German Resistance
German World War II films
2000s German films